Sekolah Agama Menengah Tinggi Tengku Ampuan Rahimah (SAMTTAR) known in English as Tengku Ampuan Rahimah Religious High School was established in Malaysia in January 1943. Its original site was a donated (wakaf) land next to the current Masjid Kampung Sungai Manggis. The school original building is still standing.

As of 2017, the school had 1049 students and 84 teaching staff.

History

The school was built in 1943 by Allahyarham Tuan Haji Ibrahim b Mohd Akim, the Village Head of Kampung Sungai Manggis. In 1945, the administration of the school was taken over by the Selangor State government and under the management of Selangor Islamic Council (Majlis Agama Islam Selangor). In 1959, part of the school was demolished in order to make way for the expansion of Masjid Kampung Sungai Manggis. A new building was then built opposite to the mosque. On January 4, 1960, the school was upgraded to become Special Religious Secondary School (Sekolah Agama Menengah Khas). On January 3, 1976, a new concrete building was erected and now it was named Lower Secondary Arabic School of Sungai Manggis (Sekolah Arab Menengah Rendah Sungai Manggis).

On January 2, 1976, again the school's name was changed to Lower Secondary Religious School of Sungai Manggis (Sekolah Agama Menengah Rendah Sungai Manggis). In 1985 the Selangor State allocated RM1.8m to add new buildings to the school. On January 3, 1985, the project was completed and it was renamed Lower Secondary Religious School of Sungai Manggis (with hostel)(Sekolah Agama Menengah Sungai Manggis (Berasrama). On December 1, 1988, a quick relief project consisting of the erection of five classrooms was carried out wholly funded by the Selangor State government.

In 1989, the school was renamed Religious High School of Sungai Manggis (Sekolah Agama Menengah Tinggi Sungai Manggis) which offered education for Form 1 to Upper Form 6. On May 14, 1991, a new block of 5 classrooms were built with the cooperation of the school and the PTA (Parent Teacher Assoc.). This project got a helping hand from the Malaysian Army (Projek Askar Turun ke Desa).

On August 15, 1992, the school was renamed Tengku Ampuan Rahimah Religious High School (Sekolah Agama Menengah Tinggi Tengku Ampuan Rahimah) taking the name of the late Sultan of Selangor's Queen. A royal officiating ceremony was graced on August 15, 1992, by Salahuddin of Selangor, the late Sultan. As of 2019, the school is already 76 years old.

References

External links
 Home Page

Kuala Langat District
Schools in Selangor